Eye Remix (stylised as OOEYヨOO -EYヨ REMIX) is EP of remixes by the Japanese band OOIOO by Boredoms member Yamantaka Eye (aka EYヨ). Originally handed out while touring in the US for the Taiga album, the EP contains two remixes by EYヨ using two Taiga tracks (UMO and UMA) as source material.

Track listing

Personnel

 Yoshimi P-We - vocals, guitar, drums
 Kayan - guitar
 Aya - bass
 Ai - drums
 Yamantaka Eye - remixer

Releases information

References

OOIOO albums
2007 remix albums
2007 EPs
Remix EPs
Thrill Jockey EPs